Alfred-Almond Junior-Senior High School is a small public high school located in Almond, Allegany County, New York, U.S.A., and is the only high school operated by the Alfred-Almond Central School District.

Footnotes

Schools in Allegany County, New York
Public high schools in New York (state)